This is a list of the main career statistics of professional French tennis player Suzanne Lenglen.

Grand Slam tournament finals

Singles: 8 finals (8 titles)

Doubles: 8 finals (8 titles)

Mixed doubles: 5 finals (5 titles)

World Hard Court Championships

Singles: 4 finals (4 titles)

Olympic finals

Singles: 1 final (1 gold medal)

Mixed Doubles: 1 final (1 gold medal)

note - Suzanne Lenglen also won a bronze medal in women's doubles.

Career finals

Singles: (83 titles)

Scores, players, events courtesy of Wright & Ditson's Lawn Tennis Guides and "Suzanne Lenglen: Tennis Idol of the Twenties."

Doubles: (73 titles)

Mixed Doubles: (87 titles)

Performance timelines

Singles

Doubles

Mixed doubles 

Source: Little

Longest winning streaks, etc

181 match win streak from 1921–1926.
341–7 (97.99%) win-loss record
Lenglen was ranked world No. 1 for eight years.
5 games lost in 5 matches at 1925 Wimbledon. All-time record.
Won the Triple Crown (singles, doubles, and mixed) three times at Wimbledon. All-time record.
In the 1922 Wimbledon final Suzanne Lenglen defeated Molla Mallory, 6–2, 6–0, in 23 minutes. All-time record.

See also
 Helen Wills career statistics

Notes

References

Bibliography
 
 

Statistics
Tennis career statistics